Aquatics at the 2013 Southeast Asian Games took place in Wunna Theikdi Swimming Pool, Naypyidaw, Myanmar for Swimming, Diving, Zayyarthiri Swimming Pool for Water Polo between December 6–21.

Swimming

Men

Women

Diving

Men

Women

Water polo

Result

Medal table

References

2013 Southeast Asian Games events
2013
2013 in water sports